Flying is the second studio album by the rock band Grammatrain. It was released in 1997 on Forefront Records.

Track listing
 "Jonah" - 2:41
 "Less of Me" - 2:48
 "Flying" - 5:11
 "Rocketship" - 2:25
 "Peace" - 4:13
 "Pain" - 4:46
 "Sell Your Soul" - 3:22
 "Fuse" - 3:48
 "Spiderweb" - 3:16
 "Found in You" - 4:44
 "For Me" - 8:50
 "(Untitled)" - 0:04

References 

Grammatrain albums
1997 albums
ForeFront Records albums